Benjamin Jones (born Feb 26, 1999) is a Canadian professional ice hockey forward currently playing for the Calgary Wranglers of the American Hockey League (AHL) as a prospect for the Calgary Flames of the National Hockey League (NHL).

Playing career
Jones was selected by the Vegas Golden Knights in the seventh round of the 2017 NHL Entry Draft, and played his junior hockey in the Ontario Hockey League (OHL) with the Niagara IceDogs, serving as their captain in 2018–19. He was signed to a three-year, entry-level contract with the Vegas Golden Knights on June 1, 2018 and played his first NHL game on November 20, 2021.

As a free agent from the Golden Knights, Jones was signed to a one-year, two-way contract with the Calgary Flames on July 16, 2022.

Career statistics

Regular season and playoffs

International

References

External links

1999 births
Living people
Calgary Wranglers players
Chicago Wolves players
Fort Wayne Komets players
Henderson Silver Knights players
Niagara IceDogs players
Vegas Golden Knights draft picks
Vegas Golden Knights players
Canadian ice hockey centres